Hiltrud (born c. 716 died 754), was a Duchess consort of Bavaria.  She was regent of Bavaria for her minor son in 748-754.

She was a daughter of Charles Martel and Rotrude of Treves. She married Odilo I of Bavaria. After his death in 748, she became regent for her son Tassilo. She died in 754, when the boy turned 13.

References

Medieval Lands Project on Chiltrudis, daughter of Charles Martel

754 deaths
Women of medieval Germany
8th-century women rulers
Year of birth unknown